The Naval Museum is a national museum in Madrid, Spain. It shows the history of the Spanish Navy since the Catholic Monarchs, in the 15th century, up to the present. The displays set naval history in a wide context with information about the history of the Spanish Empire. The collections include navigation instruments, weapons, maps and paintings.

The building

Its origins date back to a royal decree issued on 28 September 1792, yet it was not until 1843 when the Museum was inaugurated in Madrid, initially housed in the Palacio de los Consejos. It was soon moved to the "Casa del Platero" and then to the "Palacio de los Ministerios", where it remained until 1932.

The Ministry of the Navy (there used to be a standalone ministerial department for the Navy, fused with those for the Army and the Air Forces in 1977) was provided with a new headquarters in the 1920s, and the museum moved there in 1932.

Visitors enter the museum through a modernist facade on the Paseo del Prado, and pass to the first floor where former courtyards (now exhibition halls of the Naval Museum) are covered by spectacular stained-glass roofs with naval and decorative motifs made by Maumejean (a family glass-making business which had a branch in Spain). At weekends a doorway onto the grand staircase of Navy Headquarters is opened to allow visitors to appreciate the architecture.

Collections
The map of Juan de la Cosa, the earliest preserved map of the Americas, is on permanent display in this museum.

Since 2007 the museum has hosted a specimen of moon rock. One of two such samples given to Spain, it was collected on the 1972 Apollo 17 mission. The rock, which weighs one gram, was put on display in 2009, to mark the 40th anniversary of the first moon landing. The museum also displays a collection of Ming ceramics rescued from the shipwreck of the San Diego.

References
Citations

Bibliography

External links

 Pictures of ship models in the museum, from visit in May 2009 High resolution photos

Naval museums
Museums in Madrid
Maritime museums in Spain
Military and war museums in Spain
Paseo del Prado
1843 establishments in Spain
Museums established in 1843
Buildings and structures in Jerónimos neighborhood, Madrid